Jai Prakash Yadav may refer to:

 Jai Prakash Yadav (cricketer) and coach from Bhopal.
 Jai Prakash Yadav (politician) from Narpatganj, Bihar.